Krasków  is a village in the administrative district of Gmina Kluczbork, within Kluczbork County, Opole Voivodeship, in south-western Poland.

External links 
 Jewish Community in Krasków on Virtual Shtetl

References

Villages in Kluczbork County